Caridina woltereckae, or Sulawesi harlequin shrimp as it is commonly known in the aquarium hobby, is a freshwater shrimp from Sulawesi, Indonesia. It is endemic to Lake Towuti. It resembles the smaller and less contrastingly coloured Caridina spongicola, which is endemic to the same lake.

Threats
It is found on rocky substrate. It is currently under threat by introduced species like the flowerhorn cichlid, pollution by the human activities and nickel mining and uncontrolled harvesting for the aquarium trade.

References

Atyidae
Freshwater crustaceans of Asia
Endemic freshwater shrimp of Sulawesi
Crustaceans described in 2009